The women's single sculls rowing competition at the 1980 Summer Olympics took place at Krylatskoye Sports Complex Canoeing and Rowing Basin, Moscow, Soviet Union. The event was held from 21 to 26 July.

Heats 
The two fastest teams in each heat advanced to the semifinals. The remaining teams had to compete in repechage for the remaining spots in the semifinals.

Heat One

Heat Two

Heat Three

Repechage 
The three fastest teams in the repechage advanced to the semifinals.

Semifinals 
The three fastest teams in each semifinal advanced to the final.

Semifinal One

Semifinal Two

Finals

Finals A

Finals B

Finals C

References

Sources

Rowing at the 1980 Summer Olympics
Women's rowing at the 1980 Summer Olympics